Stalker was an American police procedural crime drama television series about victims of stalking and the detectives of the LAPD's Threat Assessment Unit who investigate the crimes. The show ran for one season on CBS, from October 1, 2014, to May 18, 2015. The series aired on Wednesdays for seventeen episodes and Monday for the last three.

On May 8, 2015, CBS canceled Stalker after one season, ending the show on an unresolved cliffhanger.

Plot summary
Det. Jack Larsen is a recent transfer to the LAPD Threat Assessment Unit from the NYPD homicide division, whose confidence, strong personality, and questionable behavior has landed him in trouble before—but whose past behavior may also prove valuable in his new job. His boss, Lt. Beth Davis, is strong, focused and an expert in the field, driven by her traumatic personal experience. With the rest of their team, young but eager Det. Ben Caldwell and deceptively smart Det. Janice Lawrence, Larsen and Davis assess the threat level of cases and respond before the stalking and intimidation spirals out of control, all while trying to keep their personal obsessions at bay.

Cast and characters

Main
Maggie Q as Beth Davis: a victim of stalking. Born Michelle Webber, Davis changed her name following the stalking-related death of her family. She's now a Lieutenant II in the LAPD and the officer-in-charge of the Threat Assessment Unit (TAU). Introverted, Davis considers her team to be her surrogate family; and, when she's not investigating stalking cases, she's lecturing at university campuses on the subject.
Dylan McDermott as Jack Larsen: an LAPD Detective II. He recently transferred to the TAU from the NYPD Homicide Division to be near his son. Hired because of his friends "upstairs", Larsen had to earn the respect of Davis and her team, who thought there were more deserving candidates for his position.
Mariana Klaveno as Janice Lawrence: a Detective II who is second-in-command of Davis' unit.
Victor Rasuk as Ben Caldwell: a Detective I, and a rookie member of the TAU.
Elisabeth Röhm as Amanda Taylor: the mother of Jack's son. Lovers in New York, Amanda left Jack to start a new life at the Los Angeles District Attorney's Office. She currently serves as the TAU's Deputy D.A.

Recurring
Tara Summers as Tracy Wright, Beth's best friend
Erik Stocklin as Perry Whitley/"Brody", one of Beth's stalker
Eion Bailey as Ray, one of Beth's stalkers, he once set a fire that killed her family
Gabriel Bateman as Ethan Taylor, Amanda and Jack's son
Warren Kole as Trent Wilkes, LAPD detective and Amanda's boyfriend
Mira Sorvino as Vicki Gregg, an FBI agent who replaces Beth as the interim commander of the TAU

Episodes

Critical reception 
Stalker received negative reviews from critics. The review aggregator Rotten Tomatoes reported that 20% of critics have given the film a positive review based on 49 reviews, with an average rating of 3.19/10. The site's critics consensus reads, "Stalker is chock full of perverted subjects and ugly storylines, making it hard to watch even for those who like to watch." Maureen Ryan of The Huffington Post called it "exploitative, misogynist trash". At Metacritic, the series premiere garnered a score of 17 out of 100 based on 24 critics, indicating "overwhelming dislike". The show also received negative reviews from Variety, USA Today, and The A.V. Club.

Awards and nominations

In 2015, Stalkers Dylan McDermott was nominated for a People's Choice Award for Favorite Actor in a New TV Series.

Ratings

Broadcast
Stalker was picked up by several broadcasters outside the United States. The Belgian station Vier airs Stalker as well every Sunday night as a part of their crime night. In South Africa, the series premiered on October 22, 2014, and airs on M-Net Edge on Wednesdays. It premiered in the UK and Ireland on November 10, 2014, on Sky Living and airs on Mondays. In Romania, it airs every Wednesday on Diva. In New Zealand the series premiered on TVNZ on January 12, 2015. The series premiered in Australia on Nine Network on April 12, 2015. The show also airs in France, on TF1.  In Japan, Stalker is shown on cable/satellite channel AXN. In Greece, the series premiered in September 2016, on Star Channel.

References

External links
 

2010s American crime drama television series
2010s American police procedural television series
2014 American television series debuts
2015 American television series endings
American thriller television series
CBS original programming
English-language television shows
Fictional portrayals of the Los Angeles Police Department
Television series by Warner Bros. Television Studios
Television shows filmed in California
Television shows set in Los Angeles
Works about stalking
Television series created by Kevin Williamson
Television series about prosecutors